Mohamed Sherif Mohamed Ragaei Bakr (born 4 February 1996) is an Egyptian professional footballer who plays as a striker for Egyptian club Al Ahly and the Egypt national team.

Career
Sherif was the 2020–21 CAF Champions League top goalscorer with six goals, the first player from Al Ahly to achieve this after Mohamed Aboutrika in the 2006 CAF Champions League. In addition, Sherif was the League top goal scorer with 21 goals.

Career statistics

Club

International

Scores and results list Egypt's goal tally first, score column indicates score after each Sherif goal.

Honours
Al Ahly
 Egyptian Premier League: 2017–18, 2018–19
 CAF Champions League: 2020–21
 CAF Super Cup: 2021 (May), 2021 (December)
 Egyptian Super Cup: 2021–22
 FIFA Club World Cup: Third-Place 2020, Third-Place 2021
Individual
 Egyptian Premier League top goalscorer: 2020–21
 CAF Champions League top goalscorer: 2020–21

References

1996 births
Living people
2021 Africa Cup of Nations players
Al Ahly SC players
Association football wingers
Egypt international footballers
Egyptian footballers
Egyptian Premier League players
ENPPI SC players
Wadi Degla SC players